Jaroslav Moučka (born September 10, 1992) is a Czech professional ice hockey forward.

Career 
Moučka made his Czech Extraliga debut playing with HC Pardubice during the 2013–14 Czech Extraliga season. He plays with HC Pardubice of the Czech Extraliga.

References

External links

1992 births
Living people
Czech ice hockey forwards
HC Dynamo Pardubice players
SK Horácká Slavia Třebíč players
HC Vrchlabí players
LHK Jestřábi Prostějov players
HK Spišská Nová Ves players
Hokej Šumperk 2003 players
HC Fiemme Cavalese players
Czech expatriate ice hockey players in Slovakia
HC ZUBR Přerov players
HC Slovan Ústečtí Lvi players
Czech expatriate sportspeople in Italy
Expatriate ice hockey players in Italy
Sportspeople from Pardubice